This article displays the qualifying draw for the Women's singles at the 2000 Australian Open.

Seeds

Qualifiers

Draw

First qualifier

Second qualifier

Third qualifier

Fourth qualifier

Fifth qualifier

Sixth qualifier

Seventh qualifier

Eighth qualifier

Ninth qualifier

Tenth qualifier

Eleventh qualifier

Twelfth qualifier

External links
 2000 Australian Open – Women's draws and results at the International Tennis Federation
 Official Results Archive (WTA)

Women's Singles Qualifying
Australian Open (tennis) by year – Qualifying